Lewoleba is a town and also the capital of the Lembata Regency, East Nusa Tenggara province of Indonesia. It is located in Nubatukan District on Lembata Island.

Transportation
The town is served by Wonopito Airport.

Climate
Lewoleba has a tropical savanna climate (Aw) with long dry season and short wet season.

References

Populated places in East Nusa Tenggara
Regency seats of East Nusa Tenggara
Solor Archipelago
Lembata Regency